So Little Time is an American sitcom starring Mary-Kate and Ashley Olsen in their third television series. It aired on Fox Family: the first half of the series aired from June 2 to August 15, 2001, and the series then went on a four-month hiatus owing to network management changes. By December 2001, Fox Family had become ABC Family, and the remaining episodes aired from December 1, 2001, until May 4, 2002. So Little Time reruns briefly aired on Nickelodeon in 2015 after the network acquired the rights to Mary-Kate and Ashley's video library.

Cast and characters

Main cast
 Mary-Kate Olsen as Riley Carlson
 Ashley Olsen as Chloe Carlson
 Clare Carey as Macy Carlson
 Eric Lutes as Jake Carlson
 Jesse Head as Spartacus Lawrence "Larry" Slotnick
 Taylor Negron as Manuelo Del Valle
 Natashia Williams as Tedi

Recurring cast
 Amy Davidson as Cammie Morton
 Wendy Worthington as Ellen Westmore
 Ben Easter as Lennon Kincaid

Broadcasting
In Canada, Family Channel aired reruns of the series weekdays at 6:00pm until June 28, 2007, when they were replaced by Zoey 101. In the United Kingdom, the show aired on BBC One 22 September 2001 and on the Children's Channel CBBC. Some episodes had a shorter running time than others because of the removal of the "behind the scenes" featurettes.

Later in the series, the show starts with the crew wandering around the set with the camera following them. They talk about today's events, such as the birthday of an actor on the set. Mary-Kate and Ashley Olsen usually appear in this segment.

In Italy, the series aired on Italia 1 under the name Due gemelle e un maggiordomo (Two Twins and a butler) from August until September 2002.

A short "behind the scenes" featurette was sometimes included at the end of an episode as well. Although retained on the Warner Home Video VHS and DVD releases, these were always edited out of the U.K. terrestrial transmissions.

Episodes

Home media
From 2002 to 2003, Warner Bros. and DualStar released 4 separate volumes of the show on DVD and VHS. Each volume contained 6 episodes each for a total of 24 episodes. In 2005, those 4 volumes were packaged together as one box set containing a fifth DVD with the only two episodes that had not yet been released to DVD ("Outbreak" and "Look Who's Talking"). This box set was titled So Little Time: 5 DVD Gift Set. The episodes on the gift set are not presented in air date or production order, because it is simply a repackaging of the individual DVD releases and each release had its own theme.

Although the gift set and individual releases for volumes 1 - 4 have since gone out of print, volumes 1 - 4 were re-released in 2017 as two 2-disc "double feature" sets, the first containing volumes 1 and 2 and the second containing volumes 3 and 4. The bonus disc containing "Outbreak" and "Look Who's Talking" has not been re-released and those two episodes remain only available as part of the 5 DVD Gift Set package.

 So Little Time, Volume 1: School's Cool (August 13, 2002)
 So Little Time, Volume 2: Boy Crazy (August 13, 2002)
 So Little Time, Volume 3: About A Family (August 13, 2002)
 So Little Time, Volume 4: Hangin' Out (June 3, 2003)
 So Little Time: 5 DVD Gift Set (September 6, 2005)

Books
Several episodes of So Little Time were novelized and published in book form by HarperCollins Entertainment. The series also featured new original stories based on the show, which were written by the same authors. As of the spring of 2008, 17 So Little Time books have been released, following the lives of Chloe and Riley. 
  How to Train a Boy
  Instant Boyfriend
  Too Good To Be True
  Just Between Us
  Tell Me About It
  Secret Crush
  Girl Talk
  The Love Factor
  Dating Game
  A Girl's Guide to Guys
  Boy Crazy
  Best Friends Forever
  Love is in the Air
  Spring Breakup
  Get Real
  Surf Holiday
  The Makeover Experiment

Soundtrack
A soundtrack album featuring the show's theme song as well as other music featured in the series was released by Trauma Records and Dualstar Records in June 2001, and was made available on iTunes, Amazon MP3 and Spotify on June 5, 2010, by Kirtland Records.

Arkarna - "So Little Time"
Noogie - "Mr. Fabulous"
Jason Feddy - "The Beautiful Few"
Joey Kingpin - "Rock It"
Vienna - "Where I Wanna Be"
Ritalin - "Stuck Like Glue"
George Tenen III and James Pennington - "You Make Me Love You More"
Lovepie - "Thoughts of You"
The Getaway People - "Superstar"
Chad Hollister - "Leavin' Home"
Crashpalace - "Brickwall"
The Weekend - "Punk Rock Show"

References

External links
 

2000s American teen sitcoms
2001 American television series debuts
2002 American television series endings
ABC Family original programming
English-language television shows
Fox Family Channel original programming
Television series about families
Television series about sisters
Television series about teenagers
Television series about twins
Television series by Warner Bros. Television Studios
Television shows set in Malibu, California
Works about twin sisters